The CONMEBOL–UEFA Cup of Champions, previously known officially as the European/South American Nations Cup and commonly as the Artemio Franchi Cup, is an intercontinental football match organised by CONMEBOL and UEFA and contested by the winners of the Copa América and UEFA European Championship. Organised as a quadrennial one-off match, it is a national team-equivalent to the defunct Intercontinental Cup between the club champions of Europe and South America. The competition was held twice, in 1985 and 1993, before being discontinued. It was relaunched in 2022, where it was branded as the Finalissima (Italian for "grand final"), after the signing of a memorandum of understanding between CONMEBOL and UEFA.

History

First editions and abolition
Created in 1985 as the European/South American Nations Cup, it was also referred as the "Artemio Franchi Cup" due the competition's trophy, named after Artemio Franchi, former president of UEFA who died in a road accident in 1983. It was organised jointly between CONMEBOL and the European confederation, acting as an intercontinental super cup. The competition was the national team-equivalent to the Intercontinental Cup on the club level, played between the winners of the European Cup/UEFA Champions League and Copa Libertadores. The competition was to be held every four years, with the venue alternating between Europe and South America. It was first played in 1985, between the winners of UEFA Euro 1984, France, and the winners of the 1983 Copa América, Uruguay. France hosted the match at the Parc des Princes in Paris, and won 2–0. The competition did not take place four years later, as the Netherlands (UEFA Euro 1988 winners) and Uruguay (1987 Copa América winners) were unable to agree on a date for the match. The next edition took place in 1993 between the winners of the 1991 Copa América, Argentina, and the winners of UEFA Euro 1992, Denmark. Argentina hosted the match at the Estadio José María Minella in Mar del Plata, and won 5–4 on penalties following a 1–1 draw after extra time. The competition was discontinued thereafter.

The Artemio Franchi Cup can be considered a precursor of the King Fahd Cup/FIFA Confederations Cup, played in 1992 for the first time and organised by FIFA from its third edition in 1997. The competition featured title holders of the continental championships and FIFA World Cup. After the 2017 FIFA Confederations Cup, FIFA announced in March 2019 that the tournament would be abolished.

Relaunch
On 12 February 2020, UEFA and CONMEBOL signed a renewed memorandum of understanding meant to enhance cooperation between the two organisations. As part of the agreement, a joint UEFA–CONMEBOL committee examined the possibility of staging European–South American intercontinental matches, for both men's and women's football and across various age groups. On 28 September 2021, UEFA and CONMEBOL confirmed that the UEFA European Championship and Copa América winners would face each other in an intercontinental match, with the agreement initially covering three editions starting in 2022. On 15 December 2021, UEFA and CONMEBOL again signed a renewed memorandum of understanding lasting until 2028, which included specific provisions on opening a joint office in London and the potential organisation of various football events. On 22 March 2022, UEFA announced that the "CONMEBOL–UEFA Cup of Champions" would be the new name for the Artemio Franchi Cup.

The 2022 match, known as the "Finalissima", took place between the winners of UEFA Euro 2020 (held in 2021), Italy, and the winners of the 2021 Copa América, Argentina, at Wembley Stadium in London, England. Argentina won the match 3–0 for their second title.

A women's equivalent, the Women's Finalissima between the winners of the UEFA Women's Championship and the Copa América Femenina, was also launched, with the first edition to be played in 2023 at Wembley between UEFA Women's Euro 2022 winners England and 2022 Copa América Femenina winners Brazil.

Results

Results by nation

Results by confederation

See also
 FIFA Confederations Cup
 AFC–OFC Challenge Cup
 Afro-Asian Cup of Nations
 Panamerican Championship
 Women's Finalissima

Notes

References

External links

 
 Finalissima 2022 at CONMEBOL
 Artemio Franchi Cup at RSSSF

 
CONMEBOL competitions
UEFA competitions
Quadrennial sporting events
Recurring sporting events established in 1985
1985 establishments in Europe
1985 establishments in South America